Blastobasis desertarum is a moth in the  family Blastobasidae. It is found on Madeira and the Azores. The species was recorded from greenhouses in Berlin in 2005, where it was incidentally  introduced.

It is regarded a pest on ornamental plants. The larvae feed on Aeonium and other Crassulaceae species. They feed within the stem and tunnel in the roots of their host plant.

References

Moths described in 1858
Blastobasis